The Rural Municipality of Round Hill No. 467 is a rural municipality (RM) in the Canadian province of Saskatchewan within Census Division No. 16 and  Division No. 6.

History 
The RM of Round Hill No. 467 incorporated as a rural municipality on December 11, 1911.

Geography

Communities and localities 
The following urban municipalities are surrounded by the RM.

Villages
 Rabbit Lake

The following unincorporated communities are within the RM.

Localities
 Bournemouth
 Hatherleigh
 Hillside
 Iffley
 Redfield
 Molewood
 Sandwith
 Square Hill
 Whitkow

Demographics 

Attractions 
 Woodland Lake
 Scentgrass Lake
Scent Grass Lake National Migratory Bird Sanctuary

Government 
The RM of Round Hill No. 467 is governed by an elected municipal council and an appointed administrator that meets on the second Friday of every month. The reeve of the RM is Alvin Wiebe while its administrator is Christina Moore. The RM's office is located in Rabbit Lake.

Transportation 
 Saskatchewan Highway 324
 Saskatchewan Highway 378
 Saskatchewan Highway 769
 Canadian Pacific Railway (abandoned)

See also 
List of rural municipalities in Saskatchewan

References 

Round Hill
Division No. 16, Saskatchewan